Yui Narumiya (born 22 February 1995) is a Japanese professional footballer who plays as a midfielder for WE League club INAC Kobe Leonessa.

Club career 
Narumiya made her WE League debut on 12 September 2021.

International goals

References 

Japanese women's footballers
INAC Kobe Leonessa players
WE League players
Women's association football midfielders
Association football people from Kyoto Prefecture
1995 births
Living people
Japan women's international footballers